Louis Garrel (born 14 June 1983) is a French actor and filmmaker. He is best known for his starring role in The Dreamers, directed by Bernardo Bertolucci. He has regularly appeared in films by French director Christophe Honoré, including Ma Mère, Dans Paris, Love Songs, The Beautiful Person and Making Plans for Lena. He has also been in films directed by his father, Philippe Garrel, including Regular Lovers, Frontier of the Dawn, A Burning Hot Summer, and Jealousy.

Garrel has also performed in several feature films that were written and directed by him, including: Les Deux Amis, starring Golshifteh Farahani and Vincent Macaigne; and A Faithful Man, starring Laetitia Casta and Lily-Rose Depp.

He usually plays similar characters such as men in the middle of love triangles or important historical figures such as Jacques de Bascher in Saint Laurent, Jean-Luc Godard in Le Redoutable, and Alfred Dreyfus in An Officer and a Spy. His performances have received many nominations at the César Awards.

He is also known for working with different female directors such as Valeria Bruni Tedeschi, Brigitte Sy, Maïwenn, and Nicole Garcia.

Early life 
Garrel was born in Paris, France, the son of director Philippe Garrel and actress Brigitte Sy, and the brother of actress Esther Garrel. His grandfather, Maurice Garrel, and his godfather, Jean-Pierre Léaud, are also notable French actors. His maternal grandfather was of Sephardic Jewish descent. He is a graduate of the Conservatoire de Paris.

Career 
Garrel was six when he first appeared onscreen in the film Les Baisers de secours. Twelve years later, he appeared in  Ceci est mon corps.

In 2002, Garrel gained international recognition playing Eva Green's twin brother in The Dreamers. Director Bernardo Bertolucci found him on the first session of casting in Paris. Garrel has starred in various French films, including Les Amants réguliers (2005), directed by his father Philippe Garrel. He was awarded the César Award for Most Promising Actor for his work in the film.

Garrel has collaborated five times with filmmaker Christophe Honoré in the feature films Ma Mère (2004), an adaptation of the eponymous novel by Georges Bataille; Dans Paris (2006); Love Songs (2007); The Beautiful Person (2008); Making Plans for Lena (2009); and Two Friends (2015). He also appeared in Valeria Bruni Tedeschi's Actrices (2007), Rachid Hami's Choisir d'aimer (2008) and Philipe Garrel's Frontier of the Dawn (2008).

In 2008, he launched into directing with his  short film Mes copains. Two years later, he directed the short film Petit Tailleur.

He appeared in Heartbeats, by director Xavier Dolan, released in 2010. In 2011, Garrel directed the short film La Règle de trois, with Vincent Macaigne and Golshifteh Farahani, which he presented at the Locarno Festival.

In 2014, he played Jacques de Bascher, the lover of Karl Lagerfeld and Yves Saint Laurent in Bertrand Bonello's film Saint Laurent.

His directional debut film Two Friends, starring Golshifteh Farahani, Vincent Macaigne and himself, was released in 2015.

In 2019, Garrel starred in An Officer and a Spy directed by Roman Polanski, which revolved around the Dreyfus affair. The film had its world premiere at the Venice Film Festival in August 2019, and was released in November 2019. The same year, he starred in Little Women, based upon novel of the same name.

Garrel will star in Rifkin's Festival directed by Woody Allen, DNA directed by Maïwenn, and The Story of My Wife opposite Léa Seydoux, directed by Ildikó Enyedi.

Personal life 
Aside from his native French, Garrel speaks English and Italian.

Garrel was in a relationship with Valeria Bruni Tedeschi from 2007 to 2012. She is the elder sister of Carla Bruni. In 2009, Bruni Tedeschi and Garrel adopted a baby from Senegal, whom they named Céline.

In June 2017, Garrel married model and actress Laetitia Casta and became stepfather to her three children. The couple have been together since 2015. On March 17, 2021, Casta gave birth to her fourth child, the couple's first child, a son named Azel.

In 2009 and 2010, Garrel signed two petitions in support of film director Roman Polanski, calling for his release after Polanski was arrested in Switzerland in relation to his 1977 charge for drugging and raping a then 13-year-old girl.

Filmography

As actor

As filmmaker

Other awards 
2009: Prix Patrick Dewaere

References

External links 

 Official website
 

1983 births
Living people
Male actors from Paris
French cinematographers
French film directors
French male child actors
French male film actors
French male screenwriters
French male stage actors
French male television actors
20th-century French male actors
21st-century French male actors
French National Academy of Dramatic Arts alumni
Conservatoire de Paris alumni
Most Promising Actor César Award winners
French Jews
Jewish French male actors
French Sephardi Jews